
Catarina may refer to:

People
 Catarina (given name)

Places
 Catarina, Masaya in Nicaragua
 Catarina, San Marcos in Guatemala
 Catarina, Texas in the United States
 Santa Catarina Barahona in Guatemala
 Santa Catarina Ixtahuacan in Guatemala
 Santa Catarina Mita in Guatemala
 Santa Catarina Palopó in Guatemala
 Santa Catarina (Caldas da Rainha) in Portugal
 Santa Catarina (island) in Brazil
 Santa Catarina (state) in Brazil
 Santa Catarina, Cape Verde
 Santa Catarina, Nuevo León in Mexico

Other uses
 Catarina or La Fille du Bandit, Jules Perrot's 1846 ballet
 Cyclone Catarina, a South Atlantic tropical cyclone
 Misión Santa Catarina Virgen y Mártir, a Spanish mission 
 Santa Catarina (ship), a Portuguese carrack that was seized by the Dutch East India Company

See also
Catherina (and similar spellings)